"45" is a song by American rock band Shinedown. The song was released on July 13, 2003, on the album Leave a Whisper. Following the album's release, "45" became a popular single. An acoustic cover of "45" was featured on the album's re-release on June 15, 2004.

"45" placed twelfth among U.S. Modern Rock and third among U.S. Mainstream Rock songs after its release.

Background

Brent Smith (the lead singer and songwriter) has stated in an interview:

Music video and controversy
The band requested that the music video for "45" be removed from MTV broadcast because the lyrics "the barrel of a .45" and "ashes of another life" were removed from the chorus and the title card of the video referred to the song by the MTV-originated title "Staring Down..."
Singer Brent Smith felt the editing blurred the song's message and MTV was hypocritical since they had played other unedited videos. Smith believed that if they did not wish to play the song as it was written, they should never have broadcast it. Though the edited version of the video was aired a few times without the artists' consent, the song was eventually pulled from the airwaves.

Charts

Certifications

References

2003 singles
Hard rock ballads
Shinedown songs
Songs written by Brent Smith
2003 songs
Atlantic Records singles
Songs written by Tony Battaglia